was a Japanese writer.

Biography
Yasuoka was born in pre-war Japan in Kōchi, Kōchi, but as the son of a veterinary corpsman in the Imperial Army, he spent most of his youth moving from one military post to another. In 1944, he was conscripted and served briefly overseas. After the war, he became ill with spinal caries, and it was "while he was bedridden with this disease that he began his writing career." Yasuoka died in his home at age 92 in Tokyo, Japan.

Awards
As an influential Japanese writer, Yasuoka's work has won him various prizes and awards. Notably, he received the Akutagawa Prize for Inki na tanoshimi (A Melancholy Pleasure, 1953) and Warui nakama (Bad Company, 1953); Kaihen no kōkei (A View by the Sea, 1959) won him the Noma Literary Prize; and his Maku ga orite kara (After the Curtain Fell, 1967) won the Mainichi Cultural Prize. He also received the Yomiuri Literary Prize for Hate mo nai dōchūki (The Never-ending Traveler's Journal, 1996); and the Osaragi Jirō Prize for Kagamigawa (The Kagami River, 2000).

A leading figure in post-war Japanese literature, in 2001 Yasuoka  was recognized by the Japanese government as a Person of Cultural Merit.

Literature

References

External links
Shotaro Yasuoka at J'Lit Books from Japan 

1920 births
2013 deaths
20th-century Japanese novelists
21st-century Japanese novelists
Japanese male short story writers
People from Kōchi, Kōchi
Akutagawa Prize winners
Yomiuri Prize winners
20th-century Japanese short story writers
21st-century Japanese short story writers
20th-century Japanese male writers
21st-century male writers
Japanese military personnel of World War II
Writers from Kōchi Prefecture